"Saying Hello, Saying I Love You, Saying Goodbye" is a song written by Jeff Barry, Brad Burg and Dene Hotheinz, and recorded by American country music artists Jim Ed Brown and Helen Cornelius.

It was released in November 1976 as the second single from the album I Don't Want to Have to Marry You. The song peaked at number 2 on the Billboard Hot Country Singles chart. It also reached number 1 on the RPM Country Tracks chart in Canada.

Chart performance

References

1976 singles
Jim Ed Brown songs
Helen Cornelius songs
Songs written by Jeff Barry
Song recordings produced by Bob Ferguson (musician)
RCA Records singles
Male–female vocal duets